Laila Majnu is a 2018 Indian Hindi-language romance film starring Avinash Tiwary and Tripti Dimri. It is presented by Imtiaz Ali and co-produced by Ekta Kapoor, Shobha Kapoor and Preety Ali. The film is directed by Sajid Ali.

The film was released in theatres on 7 September 2018. Although it was a commercial failure after its theatrical release, the film received critical acclaim for its story and the performances of its cast after its digital release.

Plot
Laila is a flirt who likes to tease boys who are attracted to her. She belongs to a reputed family in town. She meets Qais, a rich boy whose family have some legal dispute going on with her family. But despite the rivalry between their families, both of them fall for each other instantly. But when Laila's family finds out about their relationship, they fix her marriage with Ibban, her father's political assistant. Even though Laila waits for Qais to convince her father, she breaks up with him when he talks disrespectfully to her father. Qais tells her that he would not follow her anymore and asks her to find him if she ever need him.

After four years, Qais returns from London for his father's funeral. He avoids meeting Laila but Laila who is regularly abused by her drunkard husband, who is now the MLA, decides to meet Qais. When she sees him, she realises that he was struggling all these years with her memories, making him a different person. Laila stands up to her husband and they decide to get divorced. Laila asks Qais to wait till her divorce. However, before the divorce, her husband dies in a road accident. Laila decides to run away with Qais on the day of the funeral but her father asks her not to and promises her that she could marry him after a few weeks. Laila again asks Qais to wait for her.

Qais who had been waiting for years for her, gets a feeling that he will never get united with her and this thought makes him eccentric. He begins to have hallucinations of Laila, he talks to her and eventually runs off to a mountain. His family, friends and Laila, searches for him for days but he is still missing. Qais however thinks that Laila is with him and starts a life with her in the mountain.
He is caught by some people and is brought back to his house. There he recognises Laila but also says that Laila is not one person but she is everywhere and points to different directions.

Laila realises that she has lost him forever and dies of the grief. A completely insane Qais runs to her burial ground, falls and get severely injured. He however gets up and looks at Laila, running towards a mountain and smile.

Cast

 Avinash Tiwary as Qais Bhatt / Majnu
 Tripti Dimri as Laila
 Farhana Bhat as Jasmeet
 Duaa Bhat as Shama
 Benjamin Gilani as Sarwar
 Parmeet Sethi as Masood
 Sumit Kaul as Ibban
 Sahiba Bali as Ambreen
 Abrar Qazi as Zaid
 Shagufta Ali as Laila's Aunt
 Mir Sarwar as Qais' Brother-in-law
 Vasundhara Kaul as Qais's Sister
 Sujata Sehgal as Laila's Mother
 RJ Rafiq as Tauseef
 Moomin Rafiq as Umer
 Shahid Gulfam as Rasool

Soundtrack

Hitesh Sonik composed the film's background score and Niladri Kumar, Joi Barua and Alif composed the songs. The lyrics were written by Irshad Kamil, Mehmood Gaami and Mohammad Muneem. The first song, "Aahista", was released on 9 August 2018. This was followed by the title track, "O Meri Laila", on 13 August 2018.

Awards and nominations

References

External links
 
 Laila Majnu on Bollywood Hungama

Films based on Indian folklore
Balaji Motion Pictures films
2010s Hindi-language films
Films set in Jammu and Kashmir
Indian romantic drama films
2018 romantic drama films